Biel/Bienne is a city in the canton of Berne, Switzerland.

Biel may also refer to:

Places
 Biel, Valais, Switzerland, a village
 Biel, Ostrów Mazowiecka County, Poland, a village
 Biel, Siedlce County, Poland, a village
 Biel, Warmian-Masurian Voivodeship, Poland, a village
 Biel, East Lothian, Scotland, a village
 Biel Water, a river
 Biel House, a historic house
 Biel, Trebišov, Slovakia, a village and municipality
 Biel, Zaragoza, Spain, a municipality
 Biel District, Switzerland, of which Biel/Bienne is the seat
 Biel/Bienne (administrative district), an administrative district in the Canton of Bern, Switzerland.
 Lake Biel, Switzerland

Transport
 Biel (Goms) railway station in Biel, Valais, Switzerland
 Biel Mett railway station in Biel/Bienne, Bern, Switzerland
 Biel/Bienne railway station in Biel/Bienne, Bern, Switzerland

Other uses
 Biel (name), given name and surname
 Biel (singer), Brazilian pop and funk singer
 Biel chess tournament, held in Biel, Switzerland
 Beirut International Exhibition & Leisure Center
 Bielschowsky stain, used in neuropathology and often abbreviated as biel

See also
 Biel-Benken, a town in the canton of Basel-Land, Switzerland